The 2021–22 season is Karlsruher SC's 70th season in existence and the club's third consecutive season in the 2. Bundesliga, the second tier of German football. The club are also participating in the DFB-Pokal.

Background and pre-season

Karlsruher SC finished the 2020–21 season in 6th place, 10 points below the automatic promotion places and 12 points below the promotion play-off place.

Friendly matches

Competitions

2. Bundesliga

League table

Matches

DFB-Pokal

Transfers

Transfers in

Loans in

Transfers out

Loans out

Notes

References

Karlsruher SC
Karlsruher SC seasons